Georges Baraton (12 April 1904 – 11 November 1962) was a French middle-distance runner. He competed in the 800 metres at the 1924 Summer Olympics and the 1928 Summer Olympics.

References

External links
 

1904 births
1962 deaths
Athletes (track and field) at the 1924 Summer Olympics
Athletes (track and field) at the 1928 Summer Olympics
French male middle-distance runners
Olympic athletes of France
Place of birth missing